This is a list of destroyer escorts of the United States Navy, listed in a table sortable by both name and hull-number. It includes the hull classification symbols DE (both Destroyer Escort and Ocean Escort), DEG, and DER.

The Lend-Lease Act was passed into law in the US in March 1941 enabling the United Kingdom to procure merchant ships, warships and munitions etc. from the US, in order to help with the war effort. This enabled the UK to commission the US to design, build and supply an escort vessel that was suitable for anti submarine warfare in deep open ocean situations, which they did in June 1941. Captain E.L. Cochrane of the American Bureau of Shipping came up with a design which was known as the British Destroyer Escort (BDE). The BDE designation was retained by the first six Destroyer Escorts transferred to the United Kingdom (BDE 1, 2, 3, 4, 12 and 46); of the initial order of 50 these were the only ones the Royal Navy received, the rest being reclassified as Destroyer Escort (DE) on 25 January 1943 and taken over by the United States Navy.

Ships that were classified DE or DEG were reclassified in 1975 as FF or FFG (frigates).  This affected hull numbers DE-1037 and higher as well as all DEGs.

Classes

 97 Evarts were completed with 32 converted to Royal Navy s before commissioning as DEs
 148 Buckleys were completed
 46 converted to Captains before commissioning as DEs
 37 reclassified and converted to APDs after having been commissioned as DEs
 6 in addition to the 148 completed as APDs
 22 Rudderrow were completed
 1 converted to APD after commissioning as DE
 50 additional completed as APDs

Destroyer Escorts (DE)

Guided missile Destroyer Escorts (DEG)
 (DEG-1) Brooke
 (DEG-2) Ramsey
 (DEG-3) Schofield
 (DEG-4) Talbot
 (DEG-5) Richard L. Page
 (DEG-6) Julius A. Furer
 DEG-7 through 13 The ships were redesignated FFG, a patrol frigate design would be re-designated the FFG-7 Oliver Hazard Perry class frigate.

Radar picket Destroyer Escorts (DER)

During World War II seven DEs would be converted to this role, and during the Cold War another 36 would be converted. All would be replaced by more modern radar by 1965.

High Speed Transports (APD)

During World War II 94 DEs would be converted to High Speed Transports for amphibious assaults and raids; in 1969 all surviving ships would be reclassified as Fast Amphibious Transports (LPR).

See also
 Captain class frigate Captain class was the name the Royal Navy gave to Destroyer escorts.
 List of frigate classes
 List of frigates of the United States Navy subset of above with hull numbers DE/FF 1037 and higher plus all DEG/FFGs because of the United States Navy 1975 ship reclassification
 High-speed transport
 Crosley-class high speed transport - APDs converted from Rudderow-class DEs
 List of United States Navy amphibious warfare ships § High-speed Transport (APD)
 List of United States Navy amphibious warfare ships § Amphibious Transport, Small (LPR) - APDs reclassed as LPRs in 1969
 List of US Navy ships sunk or damaged in action during World War II § Destroyer, escort vessel (DE)
 Modern naval tactics
 Ship Characteristics Board - aka SCB

References

External links
 http://www.desausa.org/ Destroyer Escort Sailors Association (DESA).
 http://www.ussslater.org/ USS Slater, the Destroyer Escort Historical Museum.
 Destroyer escort Slater photos on board the destroyer escort USS Slater DE-766
 WWII destroyer escort photos Photos of life on board the destroyer escort USS Bangust DE-739 in World War II
 https://web.archive.org/web/20070301070801/http://www.captainclassfrigates.co.uk/ the Captain Class Frigates Association.
 http://www.uboat.net/
 Canceled destroyer escorts hull numers information
 Canceled destroyer escorts hull numers information (DE-1098 to DE-1107)

Museum ships
 USS Ainsworth (DE-1090) - İnciraltı Sea Museum, İzmir, Turkey
 USS Slater (DE-766) - Destroyer Escort Historical Museum, Albany, NY
 USS Stewart (DE–238) - Galveston Naval Museum, Galveston, TX

 
Destroyer Escorts